Pholiota astragalina is a species of fungus in the family Strophariaceae. It was first described scientifically in 1821 by Elias Magnus Fries as a species of Agaricus. Rolf Singer transferred it to the genus Pholiota in 1951. The flesh is orange, blackening in age, with a bitter taste. They produce a reddish-brown spore print, causing it to be placed in its genus rather than Hypholoma, which it resembles. The spores are oval to elliptical, smooth with thin walls, and measure 5–7 by 4–4.5 µm. In North America, the fungus is found in the United States and Canada. In Europe, it has been recorded from France, Sweden, and Switzerland. Its mushrooms usually grow singly or in small clusters, sometimes on conifer logs.

Though nonpoisonous, the species is regarded as inedible.

See also
List of Pholiota species

References

Strophariaceae
Fungi described in 1821
Fungi of Europe
Fungi of Canada
Fungi of the United States
Inedible fungi
Taxa named by Elias Magnus Fries
Fungi without expected TNC conservation status